Alliance for Poland was a right-wing Polish political party led by Gabriel Janowski. It was registered on 8 April 2001 and dissolved on 29 May 2014.

2001 establishments in Poland
2014 disestablishments in Poland
Agrarian parties in Poland
Conservative parties in Poland
Catholic political parties
Defunct political parties in Poland
Eurosceptic parties in Poland
National conservative parties
Political parties disestablished in 2014
Political parties established in 2001